Cecil Edward Oliver "Ces" Badeley (7 November 1896 – 10 November 1986) was an All Blacks rugby union player from New Zealand. He was a five-eighths.

He played 15 matches for the All Blacks, including two tests. He toured Australia in 1920, and in 1921 played in two tests against them. He captained the team to Australia in 1924, but a recurring knee injury meant he did not captain the 1924-25 tour of Britain and France.

He was born and died in Auckland. He went to Auckland Grammar School, and served in the Army in World War I.

His brother Vic Badeley was an All Black in 1922.

References

Bibliography
Palenski, R., Chester, R., and McMillan, N., (2005). The Encyclopaedia of New Zealand Rugby (4th ed.).  Auckland: Hodder Moa Beckett. 

1896 births
1986 deaths
New Zealand rugby union players
New Zealand international rugby union players
Rugby union players from Auckland
New Zealand military personnel of World War I
People educated at Auckland Grammar School